The following outline is provided as an overview of and topical guide to ancient history:

Ancient history – study of recorded human history from the beginning of writing at about 3000 BC until the Early Middle Ages. The times before writing belong either to protohistory or to prehistory. The span of recorded history is roughly 5,000 – 5,500 years, beginning with Sumerian cuneiform, the oldest form of writing discovered so far.  Although the ending date of ancient history is disputed, currently most Western scholars use the fall of the Western Roman Empire in  476 AD or the coming of Islam in 632 AD as the end of ancient history.

Nature of ancient history

What type of thing is ancient history? 
Ancient history can be described as all of the following:

Essence of ancient history 

 Timeline of ancient history

Periodization 
Periods in the Ancient Western world
 Classical antiquity
 Timeline of classical antiquity
 Archaic period in classical antiquity (c. eighth to c. sixh centuries BC)
 Iron Age Europe
 Archaic Greece
 Classical Greece (fifth to fourth centuries BC)
 Hellenistic period (323 BC to 146 BC)
 Roman Republic (fifth to first centuries BC)
 Roman Empire (first century BC to fifth century AD)
 Late Antiquity (fourth to seventh centuries AD)

Ordinal periods 
 5th millennium BC
 4th millennium BC
 40th century BC
 39th century BC
 38th century BC
 37th century BC
 36th century BC
 35th century BC
 34th century BC
 33rd century BC
 32nd century BC
 31st century BC
 3rd millennium BC
 30th century BC
 29th century BC
 28th century BC
 27th century BC
 26th century BC
 25th century BC
 24th century BC
 23rd century BC
 22nd century BC
 21st century BC
 2nd millennium BC
 20th century BC
 19th century BC
 18th century BC
 17th century BC
 16th century BC
 15th century BC
 14th century BC
 13th century BC
 12th century BC
 11th century BC
 1st millennium BC
 10th century BC
 9th century BC
 8th century BC
 7th century BC
 6th century BC
 5th century BC
 4th century BC
 3rd century BC
 2nd century BC
 1st century BC
 first millennium
 1st millennium
 2nd century
 3rd century
 4th century

Ancient history by region

Ancient geographical regions

Ancient Africa 
Ancient African history
 Ancient West Africa
 Ancient North Africa
 Africa (Roman province)
 Ancient Egypt
 History of ancient Egypt
 List of ancient Egyptian sites
 List of ancient Egyptian towns and cities
 Ancient Carthage
 Ancient Libya
 Cyrenaica
 Mauretania
 Mauretania Caesariensis
 Mauretania Sitifensis
 Mauretania Tingitana
 Ancient Central Africa
 Ancient East Africa
 Ancient Southern Africa

Ancient Asia 
Ancient Asia
 Ancient Near East (alphabetical)
 Achaemenid Empire (First Persian Empire)
 Ancient history of Cyprus
 History of ancient Egypt (see Egypt under Ancient Africa, above)
 Macedonian Empire
 Mesopotamia
 Sumer
 Akkadian Empire
 Babylonia
 Assyria
 Parthian Empire (Second Persian Empire)
 Sasanian Empire (Third Persian Empire)
 Ancient history of Yemen
 Ancient East Asia
 Ancient China
 Historical capitals of China (includes a chronology which includes ancient times)
 Ancient Japan
 Ancient South Asia
 Ancient India
 List of ancient Indian cities

Ancient Europe 
Ancient Europe
 the territory of Europe (the continent according to its modern definition) in "ancient times":
 Bronze Age Europe
 Macedonian Empire
 Iron Age Europe
 Roman imperial period (chronology)
 Roman Iron Age
 List of ancient cities in Italy
 the territories of Europe participating in Classical Antiquity 
 Ancient Greece
 Ancient Rome
 Ancient history of Transylvania

Ancient Mediterranean region 

 Ancient Mediterranean Sea
 Ancient Aegean Sea
 Aegean civilizations
 Ancient history of the islands in the Aegean Sea
 Ancient Cyclades
 Ancient Amorgos
 Ancient Anafi
 Ancient Andros
 Ancient Antiparos
 Ancient Delos
 Ancient Folegandros
 Ancient Ios (island)
 Ancient Kea (island)
 Ancient Kimolos
 Ancient Kythnos
 Ancient Milos
 Ancient Mykonos
 Ancient Naxos (island)
 Ancient Paros
 Ancient Santorini
 Ancient Serifos
 Ancient Sifnos
 Ancient Syros
 Ancient Tinos
 Ancient Sicily
 Sea of Sardinia
 Ancient Balearic Islands
 Ancient Corsica
 Ancient Sardinia

Cradles of civilization 
 Fertile Crescent
 
 Ancient Mesopotamia

Ancient political entities

Ancient states

Ancient states, by era 
 List of Bronze Age states
 List of Classical Age states
 List of Iron Age states
 List of states during Late Antiquity

Ancient states, by ordinal period 
 List of sovereign states in the 35th century BC
 List of sovereign states in 3500 BC
 List of sovereign states in the 3rd millennium BC
 List of sovereign states in the 21st century BC
 List of sovereign states in the 20th century BC
 List of sovereign states in the 19th century BC
 List of sovereign states in the 17th century BC
 List of sovereign states in the 16th century BC
 List of sovereign states in the 15th century BC
 List of sovereign states in the 14th century BC
 List of sovereign states in the 13th century BC
 List of sovereign states in the 12th century BC
 List of sovereign states in the 11th century BC
 List of sovereign states in the 10th century BC
 List of sovereign states in the 9th century BC
 List of sovereign states in the 8th century BC
 List of sovereign states in the 7th century BC
 List of sovereign states in the 6th century BC
 List of sovereign states in the 5th century BC
 List of sovereign states in the 4th century BC
 List of sovereign states in the 3rd century BC
 List of sovereign states in the 2nd century BC
 List of sovereign states in the 1st century BC
 List of political entities in the 1st century
 List of political entities in the 2nd century
 List of political entities in the 3rd century
 List of political entities in the 4th century
 List of political entities in the 5th century

Ancient sites 

 List of ancient cities in Illyria
 List of ancient cities in Serbia
 List of ancient cities in Thrace and Dacia

Place these? 
 Ammon
 Canaan
 Chaldea
 Babylonia
 Ur
 Uruk
 Eridu
 Kish
 Girsu
 Nippur
 Lagash
 Elam
 Larsa
 History of ancient Israel and Judah
 Samaria
 Edom
 Judea

Ancient government and politics 

 Political institutions of ancient Rome

Ancient law 
 Ancient Greek law
 Roman law

Ancient culture 
Ancient culture

Ancient architecture 
Ancient architecture
 Ancient Egyptian architecture
 Ancient pyramid
 Ancient Greek architecture
 Ancient Greek temple
 Ancient Roman architecture
 Ancient monument
 Ancient monuments in Ujjain
 Architecture of the ancient Near East
 Ancient synagogues in Israel
 Ancient synagogues in Palestine
 Ancient constructions of Sri Lanka
 Ancient stupas of Sri Lanka

Ancient art 
Ancient art
 Art by culture
 Ancient Greek art
 Art by type
 Ancient dance
 Dance in ancient Egypt
 Dance in ancient Greece
 Ancient music
 Music of ancient Rome
 Ancient poetry
 Ancient epic poetry
 Greek lyric
 Ancient sculpture
 Ancient Greek sculpture
 Ancient theatre
 Theatre of ancient Greece
 Theatre of ancient Rome

Ancient cuisine 
 Ancient Egyptian cuisine
 Ancient Greek cuisine
 Ancient Roman cuisine
 Ancient Rome and wine
 List of ancient dishes
 Ancient Israelite cuisine

Ancient language 
Ancient language
 Ancient Greek
 Ancient Greek dialects
 Ancient Greek grammar
 Ancient Greek grammar (tables)
 Ancient Greek nouns
 Ancient Greek verbs
 Ancient Greek personal names
 Ancient Greek phonology
 Ancient Hebrew language
 Latin
 Ancient Macedonian language

Ancient literature 
Ancient literature
 Ancient Egyptian literature
 Ancient Greek literature
 Ancient Greek novel
 Ancient Hebrew writings

Ancient people 
 List of ancient Greek tribes
 List of ancient peoples of Italy
 Notable people from ancient history
 Hittites
 Biblical Hittites
 Hasmoneans
 Habiru
 Israelites

Ancient philosophy 
Ancient philosophy
 Ancient Egyptian philosophy
 Ancient Greek philosophy

Ancient religion 
Ancient religion
 Ancient Egyptian religion
 Ancient Egyptian concept of the soul
 Ancient Egyptian creation myths
 Ancient Egyptian deities
 Ancient Egyptian funerary practices
 Ancient Egyptian funerary texts
 Egyptian mythology
 Ancient Greek religion
 Ancient Greek funeral and burial practices
 Ancient Greek temple
 Greek mythology
 Ancient Greek flood myths
 Ancient Mesopotamian religion
 Religion in ancient Rome
 Religious persecution in the Roman Empire

Ancient history by subject 
 Ancient empires
 Ancient glass trade
 Ancient Chinese glass
 Ancient maritime history
 Ancient money

Ancient economics and infrastructure 

 Roman commerce

Ancient agriculture 

 Agriculture in Mesoamerica
 Agriculture in ancient Africa
 Ancient Egyptian agriculture
 Ancient Egyptian cattle
 Agriculture in ancient Greece
 Roman agriculture
 Agriculture in ancient Tamil country
 Ancient grains
 Ancient woodland

Ancient education 
 Ancient university

Ancient science and technology 
 Ancient science
 Ancient Egyptian mathematics
 Ancient Egyptian multiplication
 History of science in classical antiquity
 Ancient Greek astronomy
 History of science and technology in the Indian subcontinent
 Ancient technology
 By civilization
 Ancient Egyptian technology
 History of timekeeping devices in Egypt
 Ancient Greek technology
 Roman technology
 Roman engineering
 By technology type
 Ancient medicine
 Ancient Egyptian medicine
 Ancient Egyptian anatomical studies
 Ancient Greek medicine
 Ancient Iranian medicine
 Ancient shipbuilding techniques

Slavery in ancient times 
 Slavery in ancient Egypt
 Slavery in ancient Greece
 Slavery in ancient Rome

Ancient sport 
 Ancient Greek boxing
 Ancient Greek Olympic festivals

Ancient warfare 
Ancient warfare
 Ancient armies
 Ancient Macedonian army
 Ancient navies and vessels
 Ancient Egyptian navy
 Ancient Greek warfare
 Ancient Macedonian battle tactics
 Ancient Roman defensive walls
 Ancient Roman military clothing

Wonders of the ancient world 
 Seven wonders of the ancient world
 Great Pyramid of Giza
 Hanging Gardens of Babylon
 Statue of Zeus at Olympia
 Temple of Artemis at Ephesus
 Mausoleum at Halicarnassus
 Colossus of Rhodes
 Lighthouse of Alexandria

History of ancient history 
 Archaeology
 Classical archaeology (Greece and Rome)
 Etruscology (Etruria)
 Near Eastern archeology
 Assyriology (Mesopotamia)
 Egyptology (Egypt)
 Historiography
 Greek historiography
 Historiography of Alexander the Great
 Roman historiography
 Historiography of the fall of the Western Roman Empire

Ancient history scholars

Ancient historical societies

Ancient themed festivals and recreational events

Notable people from ancient history 
 List of ancient Egyptians
 List of ancient Greeks
 List of ancient Macedonians
 List of ancient Romans

Leaders from ancient times 
 Pericles

Ancient philosophers

Ancient mathematicians

Ancient scholars

See also 

 Development note: the following topics need placement in the outline above

 Ancient Chinese states
 Ancient Chinese urban planning
 Ancient Chinese wooden architecture
 Ancient Egyptian flint jewelry
 Ancient Egyptian offering formula
 Ancient Egyptian retainer sacrifices
 Ancient Egyptian royal titulary
 Ancient Egyptian solar ships
 Ancient Egyptian trade
 Ancient Egyptian units of measurement
 Ancient Greek Musical Notation
 Ancient Greek Numbers
 Ancient Greek accent
 Ancient Greek clubs
 Ancient Greek coinage
 Ancient Greek comedy
 Ancient Greek eros
 Ancient Greek military personal equipment
 Ancient Greek units of measurement
 Ancient Macedonian calendar
 Ancient Mediterranean piracy
 Ancient Mesopotamian units of measurement
 Ancient Roman bathing
 Ancient Roman pottery
 Ancient Roman units of measurement
 Ancient borough
 Ancient document
 Ancient economic thought
 Ancient filipino diet and health
 Ancient furniture
 Ancient higher-learning institutions
 Ancient iron production
 Ancient kingdoms of Anatolia
 Ancient monuments of Java
 Ancient settlements in Turkey
 Ancient solution
 Ancient towns in Saudi Arabia
 Ancient trackway
 Ancient underground quarry, Jordan Valley
 Ancient veena
 Ancient vessel
 Ancient Roman sarcophagi

References

External links 

 Websites
 World History Encyclopedia
 Ancient Civilizations—British Museum's website on various topics of ancient civilization
 Ancient history sourcebook
 The Perseus digital library
 Barrington Atlas of the Greek and Roman world

 Directories
 
 Ancient History - Academic Info: directory of online resources for the study of ancient history.
 Ancient History Resources : Ancient history research links for high school and college students

Ancient history
Ancient history
+
History-related lists
Ancient history-related lists